Marley Joseph Watkins (born 17 October 1990) is a Welsh professional footballer who plays as a striker or winger for Scottish Premiership club Aberdeen. He previously played for Cheltenham Town, Bath City, Hereford United, Inverness Caledonian Thistle, Barnsley, Norwich City, Bristol City and Cardiff City. Born in England, he represented the Wales national team.

Personal life
Born in Lewisham in London, Watkins grew up in Swansea in Wales. Through his parents, he qualifies to play for Wales and France. He is the grandson of Welsh poet Vernon Watkins (1906–1967).

Club career
Watkins started his career as a youth player at Swansea City but was released and he joined Cheltenham Town in 2008. On 9 August 2008, he made his first senior appearance for the club, playing in the last ten minutes of a 4–2 defeat at Northampton Town. In doing so, he became Cheltenham Town's youngest ever league player. He scored his first professional goal after coming on as a substitute against Northampton in the 2009–10 season.

In September 2010, Watkins joined Conference National side Bath City on loan. He subsequently signed for Bath on a permanent basis in January 2011, after his successful loan spell.

At the start of the 2012–13 season, Watkins signed a one-year deal at Hereford United. Watkins enjoyed a successful start to his Hereford career by winning a 'Player of the Month' award in his first month at the club. He ultimately played 34 league games and scored five goals in his season at Hereford.

In June 2013 it was announced that Watkins would be joining Inverness Caledonian Thistle for the 2013–2014 season. He made his Scottish Premiership debut at Celtic Park on 24 August, coming on as a substitute in a 2–2 draw with Celtic. On 30 May 2015, he opened the scoring for Inverness in the Scottish Cup Final at Hampden Park, as the club secured a 2–1 victory against Falkirk. During his time at Inverness, the club reached the final of the 2013–14 Scottish League Cup and in addition to the Scottish Cup win, they finished third in the Scottish Premiership in 2014–15 and qualified for European football for the first time in their history.

On 5 June 2015, Watkins signed for League One club Barnsley. In his first season with Barnsley, the club won the Football League Trophy against Oxford United, and won promotion via the playoffs to gain promotion to the Championship. He scored eight goals and got nine assists in 42 games during his debut season with Barnsley. Additionally, Watkins scored on his Championship debut against Ipswich Town and assisted another with Barnsley losing the game, 4–2.

On 1 June 2017, Watkins signed for Championship club Norwich City on a free transfer. He joined the club on 1 July. He scored his first goal for Norwich in an EFL Cup tie against Charlton Athletic on 22 August 2017.

On 15 June 2018, after one season at Norwich City, Watkins signed for fellow Championship side Bristol City for a fee of £1 million. The move reunited him with Lee Johnson, his manager at Barnsley.

On 22 August 2020, Watkins signed for Aberdeen on loan until January 2021. He scored his first goal in a 3–0 away win over Ross County in the Scottish Premiership on 27 September, his first Scottish League goal since 31 January 2015, which, incidentally, was also against Ross County.

In late December 2020, Watkins returned to Bristol City.

In March 2021, Watkins returned to action with The Robins, coming off the bench in their 3–0 away win against Birmingham City.

On 14 May 2021, he was released by Bristol City following the expiry of his contract.

On 10 August 2021, Watkins joined Cardiff City. On that same day he made his debut and scored twice in a 3-2 EFL Cup win over Sutton United. However, shortly afterwards, the club confirmed Watkins would not be offered an extension beyond his initial one-month deal.

On 26 August 2021, Watkins returned for a second spell with Aberdeen, signing a two-year contract.

International career
Watkins was born in England, and is of Welsh and French descent. Watkins was called up to the Wales national team on 25 May 2017, for a match against Serbia on 11 June 2017. He made his debut for the side on 14 November 2017, as a substitute during a 1–1 draw with Panama.

Career statistics

Honours
Inverness Caledonian Thistle
Scottish Cup: 2014–15

Barnsley
Football League Trophy: 2015–16
Football League One play-offs: 2016

References

External links

1990 births
Living people
Footballers from the London Borough of Lewisham
Welsh footballers
Wales international footballers
English footballers
Welsh people of French descent
English people of Welsh descent
English people of French descent
Association football midfielders
Swansea City A.F.C. players
Cheltenham Town F.C. players
Bath City F.C. players
Hereford United F.C. players
Inverness Caledonian Thistle F.C. players
Barnsley F.C. players
English Football League players
National League (English football) players
Scottish Professional Football League players
Norwich City F.C. players
Bristol City F.C. players
Aberdeen F.C. players